is a former Bolivian-Japanese football player. He used his name "石川 康" until 2001.

Club career
Ishikawa established himself as one of the most unflappable defenders in the league as a side back at Verdy Kawasaki in the early 1990s, and he maintained that reputation for almost ten years. Though his speed on the overlap began to fade as he got older, Ishikawa was a key contributor on offense as well, with a very accurate cross. Born in Bolivia to a Japanese foreign affairs official, he began playing football at a young age for the renowned and prestigious Tahuichi Academy. Considering his good form, Ishikawa was selected to play for Bolivia in the 1985 U-16 World Championship held in China and the 1987 U-16 World Championship held in Canada. In his younger years, when he had the speed to outrun defenders down the right wing, he could be truly dangerous on both ends, but his specialty was always on defense. He developed good instincts and positioning during a short stint in Brazil, before the J1 League was created, and returned to Japan to join Verdy Kawasaki in 1992 as one of the new league's young stars. He was a member of two championship teams with Verdy, and helped Nagoya Grampus Eight to an Emperor's Cup crown. Even though he maintained a steady performance down through the years, he was never considered for the Japan national team.

Club statistics

Club titles

References

External links

1970 births
Living people
Sportspeople from Santa Cruz de la Sierra
Japanese footballers
Bolivian footballers
Bolivia youth international footballers
Japan Soccer League players
J1 League players
Honda FC players
Tokyo Verdy players
Nagoya Grampus players
Association football defenders
Bolivian people of Japanese descent
Bolivian emigrants to Japan
Bolivian expatriate sportspeople in Japan
Naturalized citizens of Japan